The 1996–97 season was Birmingham City Football Club's 94th in the Football League. They finished in tenth position in the 24-team Division One, the second tier of the English football league system. They entered the 1996–97 FA Cup at the third round, losing to Wrexham in the fifth, and entered the League Cup in the first round and lost to Coventry City in the second.

Season summary
This was the first season under the managership of playing legend Trevor Francis, appointed in May 1996 after the dismissal of previous incumbent Barry Fry. Francis introduced players with top-level experience such as Manchester United captain Steve Bruce.  There were a significant number of transfers and loans with Peterborough United, Fry's new team.

Football League First Division

Match details

League table (part)

Note that goals scored took precedence over goal difference as a tiebreaker in the Football League.

Results summary

FA Cup

a. The match was drawn to be played at Stevenage Borough's Broadhall Way ground, but the venue was switched on police advice.

League Cup

Transfers

In

a. The deal also included Andy Edwards moving in the other direction.
b. The move was part of the deal in which Jonathan Hunt moved in the other direction for a £500,000 fee.

Out

 Brackets round a club denote the player joined that club after his Birmingham City contract expired.
a. The move was part of the deal in which Martyn O'Connor moved in the other direction for a £500,000 fee.
b. The deal also included Darren Wassall moving in the other direction.

Loan in

Loan out

Appearances and goals

Numbers in parentheses denote appearances as substitute.
Players with name struck through and marked  left the club during the playing season.
Players with names in italics and marked * were on loan from another club for the whole of their season with Birmingham.

See also
 List of Birmingham City F.C. seasons

Sources
 
 
 For match dates, league positions and results: 
 For lineups, appearances, goalscorers and attendances: Matthews (2010), Complete Record, pp. 428–29.
 For goal times: 
 For transfers: 
 For discipline: individual player pages linked from  Note that the Soccerbase figures omit appearances in the away game at Norwich City, so the figures above omit any disciplinary cards received in that game.

References

Birmingham City F.C. seasons
Birmingham City